
The Russ Building is a Neo-Gothic office tower located in the Financial District of San Francisco, California. It was designed by architect George W. Kelham, who was responsible for many of San Francisco's other prominent high-rise buildings in the 1920s. The  building was completed in 1927 and had 32 floors as well as the city's first indoor parking garage. It was the tallest building in San Francisco from 1927 to 1964 and one of the most prominent, along with its  "twin", the PacBell Building to the south.

Upon completion, the building was iconic enough that Architect and Engineer wrote, “In nearly every large city there is one building that because of its size, beauty of architectural design and character of its use and occupancy, has come to typify the city itself ... Today the Russ Building takes this place in San Francisco. By its size and location and by the character of its tenants the building becomes indeed—'The Center of Western Progress'.”

However, Manhattanization from 1960 to 1990 has shrouded the tower in a shell of skyscrapers, removing the tower's prominence.

The San Francisco Chronicle's architecture critic John King described the Russ Building as "the embodiment of Jazz Age romance, a full block of ornate Gothic-flavored masonry that ascends in jagged stages from Montgomery Street with a leap and then a scramble to a central crown". The tower is a California Historical Landmark.

Until the emergence of Sand Hill Road in the 1980s, many of the largest venture capital firms held offices in the Russ Building.

See also

Eliel Saarinen's Tribune Tower design
PacBell Building
List of tallest buildings in San Francisco

References

Further reading

External links
 The Russ Building at Shorenstein Properties 
 The Russ Building's Tenant Handbook
 The Russ Building at The Swig Company

Office buildings completed in 1927
Landmarks in California
Skyscraper office buildings in San Francisco
Swig Company
Financial District, San Francisco